Hoffman Estates is a village in Illinois, United States. The village is located primarily in Cook County, with a small section in Kane County. It is a suburb of Chicago. Per the 2020 census, the population was 52,530.

The village now serves as the headquarters for Sears and the American headquarters for Mori Seiki. The village owns Now Arena, home of the Windy City Bulls of the NBA G League.

In 2009, the village hosted the Heartland International Tattoo, one of the largest music and dance festivals of its kind in the Midwest.

History

Prior to the 1940s, German settlers moved into the area west of Roselle Road and north of Golf Road, then known as Wildcat Grove. The area was sparsely populated until farmers purchased land in the area in the 1940s.

In 1954, Sam and Jack Hoffman, owners of a father-son owned construction company, bought 160 acres of land in the area. The pair constructed homes and began the development the region which now bears their name. As residents moved in, they voted to incorporate the area, and the Village of Hoffman Estates was incorporated on September 23, 1959. In 1973, six former town officials, including mayors Edward F. Pinger (1959−1965) and Roy L. Jenkins (1965−1969) were indicted on bribery and tax charges.

Once the Northwest Tollway opened, Schaumburg Township became more attractive to Chicago commuters. In the early 1960s, land annexations north of the tollway and in other neighboring regions more than doubled Hoffman Estates's land area.

The opening of the Woodfield Mall in Schaumburg to the east in 1971 made the area a major business center. An attempt to change the name of the village to East Barrington, among other names, was made in the early 1980s but failed upon a residential vote.

In the 1990s, the Prairie Stone Business Park began development. This  planned multi-purpose business park is bounded by Illinois Route 59 on the east, Interstate 90 on the south, Illinois Route 72 on the north, and Beverly Road on the west. The business park came to fruition in 1993 when Sears, Roebuck and Company relocated from the Sears Tower in Chicago to a sprawling headquarters in the northwest part of Prairie Stone. That was followed in by Indramat and Quest International, which in 1995 also opened facilities in the park. Throughout the 1990s, a health and wellness center and child care facility were developed, as well as other smaller office buildings, and a branch of Northern Illinois University. Development of the business park is still ongoing, and recent additions in the 2000s include the 11,000-seat Now Arena; office buildings for Serta, WT Engineering, I-CAR, and Mary Kay; a Cabela's outdoor outfitters store; a 295-room Marriott hotel; and the  Poplar Creek Crossing Retail Center, which is anchored by Target and numerous other big-box retailers. Future development will include further office buildings and retail development, Sun Island Hotel and Water Park, an amphitheater, and restaurants.

In 2011, the Village of Hoffman Estates took over ownership of the Now Arena. On June 23, 2020, the Village of Hoffman Estates approved an $11.5 million deal to rename the Sears Centre Arena to the "NOW Arena".

In the fall of 2016, papers and artifacts from President Barack Obama's administration began to arrive in town, where they are being stored in a building on Golf Road. The site is their temporary home while construction takes place on the Barack Obama Presidential Center in Jackson Park, Chicago, and is not open to the public.

In January 2020, the Centers for Disease Control and Prevention (CDC) confirmed the second U.S. case of COVID-19 in a Hoffman Estates resident. The patient, a woman in her 60s returning from Wuhan, China, was treated at St. Alexius Medical Center. Her husband was later infected in the first case of human-to-human transmission of the SARS-CoV-2 virus in the United States.

Geography
Hoffman Estates is located at  (42.063173, -88.119256).

Demographics
As of the 2020 census there were 52,530 people, 18,110 households, and 14,048 families residing in the village. The racial makeup of the village was 52.08% White, 26.26% Asian, 4.87% African American, 0.60% Native American, 0.02% Pacific Islander, 7.51% from other races, and 8.68% from two or more races. Hispanic or Latino of any race were 16.14% of the population.

There were 18,110 households, out of which 61.17% had children under the age of 18 living with them, 61.71% were married couples living together, 11.97% had a female householder with no husband present, and 22.43% were non-families. 18.07% of all households were made up of individuals, and 5.43% had someone living alone who was 65 years of age or older. The average household size was 3.16 and the average family size was 2.77.

The village's age distribution consisted of 23.1% under the age of 18, 7.3% from 18 to 24, 27.7% from 25 to 44, 28.3% from 45 to 64, and 13.5% who were 65 years of age or older. The median age was 38.2 years. For every 100 females, there were 97.6 males. For every 100 females age 18 and over, there were 96.4 males.

The median income for a household in the village was $92,423, and the median income for a family was $103,641. Males had a median income of $56,210 versus $42,288 for females. The per capita income for the village was $40,016. About 3.3% of families and 4.3% of the population were below the poverty line, including 4.9% of those under age 18 and 3.5% of those age 65 or over.

Note: the US Census treats Hispanic/Latino as an ethnic category. This table excludes Latinos from the racial categories and assigns them to a separate category. Hispanics/Latinos can be of any race.

Economy

Employers
Many Japanese companies have their U.S. headquarters in Hoffman Estates and Schaumburg but the largest employers in Hoffman Estates as of 2020 are:

Education
The village is served by several public school districts. The majority of residents who live in Schaumburg Township attend:
 Township High School District 211
 School District 54 (K-8)
North Hoffman Estates (north of I-90) residents are served by:
 Township High School District 211
 Community Consolidated School District 15 (K-8) (East of Huntington Blvd)
 Barrington School District 220 (K-12) (Unit District) (West of Huntington Blvd).
Residents west of Barrington Road primarily attend Unit School District, Elgin Area U46.

High schools
Schools located in the Hoffman Estates village limits:
 Hoffman Estates High School
 James B. Conant High School

Other high schools in the same township high school district:
 Schaumburg High School
 William Fremd High School
Palatine High School

Community college
Most of the village is served by Harper College Community College District 512.

Miscellaneous education
The Xilin Northwest Chinese School (S: 希林西北中文学校, T: 希林西北中文學校, P: Xīlín Xīběi Zhōngwén Xuéxiào) holds its classes at Conant High School in Hoffman Estates. It serves grades preschool through 12. The school predominately serves Mainland Chinese families. In 2003 the school held its classes in Palatine High School in Palatine. In 2000 the school had served around 300 students. This figure increased almost by 100%, to almost 600 students. This made it one of the largest of the Chinese schools in the Chicago area.

Library

 Barrington Area Library
 Schaumburg Township District Library
 Gail Borden Public Library District
 Palatine Township Library

Sister city
Hoffman Estates has one sister city:
 Angoulême, Charente, Nouvelle-Aquitaine, France

Notable people
 Tammy Duckworth, U.S. Senator from Illinois (2016–present)
 Rob Valentino (b. 1985), former soccer player who is an assistant coach for Atlanta United

Notes

External links
 Village of Hoffman Estates official website

 
Villages in Illinois
Chicago metropolitan area
Villages in Cook County, Illinois
Villages in Kane County, Illinois
Populated places established in 1959
1959 establishments in Illinois
Majority-minority cities and towns in Kane County, Illinois
Majority-minority cities and towns in Cook County, Illinois